Sentinel is a former settlement in Fresno County, California. It still appeared on maps as of 1924.

A post office operated at Sentinel from 1880 to 1883, from 1888 to 1897, and from 1905 to 1910.

References

Former settlements in Fresno County, California
Former populated places in California